Nikola Hristić (Sremska Mitrovica, 10 August 1818 – Belgrade, 26 November 1911) was a Serbian politician who served as Prime Minister of Serbia for four terms.

Biography
Hristić was born and educated in Sremska Mitrovica. In 1840 he came to live and work in Belgrade, where he joined the Civil Service as a clerk in the Judiciary. Later he became head of the Serbian gendarmerie. Mihailo Obrenović made him Minister of Internal Affairs in 1860. On 15 June 1862 Hristić was a witness to what began as a skirmish but developed into a major conflict between the Serbian Gendarmerie and Turkish troops at Belgrade. The incident at Čukur Fountain (Čukur česma) began when a boy with a jug was shot and killed by a Turkish soldier which resulted in the bombardment of the Serbian capital by Turkish artillery ensconced in the Kalemegdan fortress. In his memoirs, Hristić wrote vividly of the extraordinary events that followed in which he played no small role in that affair. Serbia's de facto independence ensued in 1867, following the expulsion of all Ottoman troops from the country. Hristić was named president of the new Principality of Serbia until Mihailo's assassination in 1868. On that tragic day, Hristić ordered the arrest of the assassins, had them tried, convicted and shot before a firing squad. He was totally and completely loyal to Mihailo Obrenović. He re-organized the police force throughout the country, checked liberal opposition, eradicated brigandage, and was firmly in control of the municipalities. 

He retired after Mihailo's death when a new government was formed under Milan I of Serbia. King Milan I was facing the Timok Rebellion, so he got Nikola Hristić out of retirement and installed him as the new prime minister and as the minister of internal affairs. The Timok Rebellion was successfully crushed, and the leaders of it, most notably Nikola Pašić of the People's Radical Party, fled to Bulgaria. After the rebellion was crushed, new elections were held in early 1884, and a new cabinet was formed under Milutin Garašanin. Milan erred in identifying Sava Grujić's views with the Radical party, which had not taken a stand on the divorce question. Consequently, he decided that he needed  another cabinet to settle the divorce problem. Again Milan turned to the time-tested and dependable bureaucrat – Nikola Hristić – who put together a cabinet in April 1888. Hristić retired the following year, and in 1894 he came out of retirement to become prime minister for the fourth time. In mid-1895 he was dismissed and re-appointed as president of the State Council. Hristić finally retired for good in 1901.
 
Nikola Hristić was married to Juliana (born Hadži-Jovanović), the granddaughter of Toma Vučić-Perišić, one of the leaders of the Serbian Revolution. Hristić's son – Kosta (1852–1927) – was a lawyer, diplomat and minister of justice; his daughter Poleksija (1861–1933) was married to Laza Lazarević, the famed Serbian physician writer.

Nikola Hristić died on 26 November 1911 in Belgrade, at the age of 93. 

Nikola Hristić is remembered as a very capable administrator and personally honest man of conservative views.

References

See also
List of prime ministers of Serbia

 

1818 births
1911 deaths
People from Sremska Mitrovica
Prime Ministers of Serbia
Government ministers of Serbia
Foreign ministers of Serbia
Interior ministers of Serbia